Sergeant Jack Mason  (1896–1968) was a British World War I flying ace credited with five aerial victories.

In 1917 Mason was a Corporal in the Royal Flying Corps, serving as an observer/gunner in No. 11 Squadron, flying the Bristol F.2b two-seater fighter. His first aerial victory came on 8 June, with Captain Richard Raymond-Barker as his pilot, when he drove down out of control an Albatros D.III over Bohain. On 14 August he drove down an Albatros D.V over Brebières, and on 21 October accounted for three D.Vs over Boiry–Lécluse, with pilot Lieutenant Ronald Mauduit on both occasions.

He gained his own flying licence and was credited with 5 aerial victories.

In November 1917 he was awarded the Military Medal.

During WW2 he again served at the Naval base in Londonderry, was involved in Operation Deadlight, and was awarded the Atlantic Star.

References 

1896 births
1968 deaths
British World War I flying aces
Recipients of the Military Medal
Royal Air Force airmen
Royal Flying Corps soldiers
Royal Navy personnel of World War II